The Larkin House is a historic house at 464 Calle Principal in Monterey, California.  Built in 1835 by Thomas O. Larkin, it is claimed to be the first two-story house in all of California, with a design combining Spanish Colonial building methods with New England architectural features to create the popular Monterey Colonial style of architecture. The Larkin House is both a National and a California Historical Landmark, and is a featured property of Monterey State Historic Park.

Description
The Larkin House is located in the historic center of Monterey, California, at the southwest corner of Calle Principal and Jefferson Street. It is a two-story wood-frame structure, with walls of adobe and a low-pitch hip roof.  Three of its four sides are covered by a two-story wood-frame flat-roof veranda.  The post-and-beam framing is exposed in the interior, where there is also a fireplace and chimney.

The building was originally part of a large piece of property at Calle Principal in Monterey. It shares a parcel of land with the Sherman Quarters. In  William T. Sherman's memoirs, he talks about the house as ''the adobe back of Larkin's." The entrance is located in the gardens of the Larkin House.

History
In 1832 Thomas O. Larkin, a native of Massachusetts, joined his half-brother John B. R. Cooper in business in California. Larkin became the most influential American in Monterey, then the capital of Alta California. He served as the only United States consul to Mexico in Monterey.  Larkin sought to build a house more typical of his native New England, but local sawmills were unable to supply him with sufficient redwood for the purpose.  Larkin compromised by building a typical New England frame, but then finished its walls in whitewashed adobe.  The framing made it possible to significantly enlarge the window openings over traditional Spanish Colonial architecture, and the style of this house rapidly spread across California.  The house is believed to be the first two-story house in California, and the first to have a chimney.

The Larkin House was designated as a California Historical Landmark in 1933. It then became a National Historic Landmark in 1960 and is part of the larger Monterey State Historic Park, which is itself designated a National Historic Landmark District.

See also
List of National Historic Landmarks in California
National Register of Historic Places listings in Monterey County, California

References

External links

Archived version of Historic Monterey website
Monterey State Historic Park Association
Official Monterey State Historic Park website

History of Monterey County, California
History of the Monterey Bay Area
Houses in Monterey County, California
Houses on the National Register of Historic Places in California
Houses on the National Register of Historic Places in Monterey County, California
Historic American Buildings Survey in California
National Historic Landmarks in California
Spanish Colonial architecture in California
Spanish Revival architecture in California
Museums in Monterey County, California
Historic house museums in California
Buildings and structures in Monterey, California
Monterey State Historic Park
National Register of Historic Places in Monterey County, California
Individually listed contributing properties to historic districts on the National Register in California
National Historic Landmark District contributing properties